Adamovka is a rural locality (a village) in Truntaishevsky Selsoviet, Alsheyevsky District, Bashkortostan, Russia. The population was 1 as of 2010. There is 1 street.

Geography 
Adamovka is located 30 km northwest of Rayevsky (the district's administrative centre) by road. Ustyevka is the nearest rural locality.

References 

Rural localities in Alsheyevsky District